Dromica dobbersteini is a species of tiger beetle, described by Schüle and Moravec in 2002. It is currently only known from Eswatini (Swaziland).

References 

dobbersteini
Endemic fauna of Eswatini
Beetles described in 2002